The 151st Pennsylvania House of Representatives District is located in Montgomery County and includes the following areas:

Ambler
 Horsham Township 
 Montgomery  Township (part)
District 04 
District 05 
District 06 
District 07 
District 08
 Upper Dublin Township (part)
 District 01 (part
Division 02
District 02 (part)
Division 03 
District 03 
District 06 
District 07

Representatives

References

151
Government of Montgomery County, Pennsylvania